The Najaf governorate election of 2013 was held on 20 April 2013 alongside elections for all other governorates outside Iraqi Kurdistan, Kirkuk, Anbar, and Nineveh.

Results 

|- style="background-color:#E9E9E9"
!align="left" colspan=2 valign=top|Party/Coalition!! Allied national parties !! Leader !!Seats !! Change !!Votes !! % !! Swing
|-
|
|align=left|Loyalty for Najaf|| align=left| || Adnan al-Zurufi || 9 || 5 || 118,310 || 29.33% || 20.4%
|-
|bgcolor="#009933"|
|align=left|Citizens Alliance ||align=left|ISCI|| Ammar al-Hakim|| 6 || 1 || 82,020 || 20.34% || 5.53%
|-
|bgcolor="#FF0000"|
|align=left|State of Law Coalition || align=left|Islamic Dawa Party ||Nouri Al-Maliki|| 5 || 3 || 76,519 || 18.97% || 2.75%
|-
|bgcolor="#000000"|
|align=left|Liberal Coalition|| align=left|Sadrist Movement || Muqtada al-Sadr || 4 || 2 || 45,167 || 11.20% || 0.67%
|-
|
|align=left|Equitable State Movement || || || 2 || 2 || 25,889 || 6.42% ||
|-
|
|align=left|Najaf Province’s Change Coalition||align=left| || || 1 || 1  || 14,464 || 3.59% || 
|-
|
|align=left|National Partnership Gathering || || || 1 || 1 || 14,314 || 3.55% || 
|-
|
|align=left|Renaissance and Building Gathering || || || 1 || 1 || 8,521 || 2.11% || 
|-
|bgcolor="#286F42"|
|align=left|Islamic Dawa Party – Iraq Organisation || || Hashim Al-Mosawy || 1 || 1 || 7,571 || 1.88% || 
|-
|
|align=left|Al Najaf Civil Alliance || || ||  || || 5,760  || 1.43% || 
|-
|bgcolor="#098DCD"|
|align=left|Al Iraqia National and United Coalition|| || Ayad Allawi || || || 2,599 || 0.64% || 
|-
|bgcolor="#F6BE22"|
|align=left|Iraq’s Benevolence and Generosity List || || ||  || || 1,976 || 0.49% || 0.49%
|-
|
|align=left|Iraq’s Integrity Gathering || || ||  || || 211 || 0.05% || 0.05%
|-
|colspan=2 align=left|Total || || || 29 || – || 403,321 || ||
|-
|colspan=9 align=left|Sources: Musings on Iraq, ISW, IHEC Najaf Results, List of political coalition approved for election in provincial councils – IHEC , al-Sumaria – Najaf Coalitions
|-
|colspan=9 align=left|Notes:

References 

2013 Iraqi governorate elections
Najaf Governorate